Edward M. Morgan (1855 - January 9, 1925) was the Postmaster of New York City for the first delivery of airmail by Earle Lewis Ovington.

Biography
He was born in 1855. Morgan started off as a letter carrier, and was appointed Postmaster of New York City by President Theodore Roosevelt on August 14, 1907, succeeding William R. Willcox, who had resigned to head the Public Service Board. Thomas F. Murphy was appointed as the assistant Postmaster. On December 13, 1911, President William Howard Taft reappointed him to another term of office. 

He died on January 9, 1925, at the Lutheran Hospital in Brooklyn, New York City.

References

External links

1855 births
1925 deaths
Postmasters of New York City